Tesfaye Tafese (born 10 June 1986) is an Ethiopian footballer currently playing for Al-Tilal SC in the Yemeni League.

Career
Tafase scored in the opening round of the 2011 AFC Cup group stage against I-League club Dempo SC however it was not enough as Al-Tilal lost 2–1.

International career
Tafase has represented his country of Ethiopia on 11 occasions, scoring 3 goals, including once against Rwanda during a 2010 FIFA World Cup qualifying match.

References

External links
 
 FIFA Profile

Living people
1986 births
Sportspeople from Addis Ababa
Ethiopian footballers
Ethiopia international footballers
Association football forwards
Yemeni League players
Al-Tilal SC players